Yuriy Hryhoriyovych Harbuz (Ukrainian: Юрій Григорійович Гарбуз; born on 18 November 1971), is a Ukrainian politician who served as the Governor of Luhansk Oblast.

Biography

Yuriy Harbuz was born in Milove on 18 November 1971.

In January 2014, he was appointed chairman of the Milove District State Administration, from which he resigned in April 2014.

In 2014, he was elected a member of the Milov District Council of the IV convocation.

On April 29, 2016, by the decree of Petro Poroshenko, Harbuz was appointed as Governor of Luhansk Oblast.

Personal life

, Harbuz has a girlfriend and has 3 children. In his spare time, he goes out hunting.

References

1971 births
Living people
People from Luhansk Oblast
Independent politicians of Petro Poroshenko Bloc
Eighth convocation members of the Verkhovna Rada
Governors of Luhansk Oblast